This is a list of Middle-earth role-playing games. J. R. R. Tolkien's Middle-earth fictional universe has been the setting for several role-playing games.

Tabletop role-playing games 
 Middle-earth Role Playing (Iron Crown Enterprises, 1982)
 Lord of the Rings Adventure Game (Iron Crown Enterprises, 1991)
 The Lord of the Rings Roleplaying Game (Decipher, Inc., 2002)
 The One Ring: Adventures over the Edge of the Wild (Cubicle 7, 2011)
 Adventures in Middle-earth (OGL supplement by Cubicle 7, 2016)

Role-playing video games 
 Elendor (1991)
 MUME (1992)
 The Two Towers (1994)
 The Lord of the Rings Online: Shadows of Angmar (2007)
 The Lord of the Rings: The Third Age (2004)
 The Lord of the Rings: Tactics (2005)
 The Lord of the Rings: War in the North (2011)
 Middle-earth: Shadow of Mordor (2014)
 Middle-earth: Shadow of War (2017)

Text-based role-playing Games 
 World of Middle Earth (2020)

See also

 Middle-earth in video games

References

 
Middle-earth
Role-playing games